The 1968 Penn State Nittany Lions represented Pennsylvania State University in the 1968 NCAA University Division football season. The 1968 team was Paterno's first perfect season. Despite going 11–0, the Nittany Lions finished behind 10–0 Ohio State in the final AP Poll (conducted after bowl season), and behind Ohio State and 9–0–1 USC in the final Coaches Poll (conducted before bowl season).

Schedule

Roster

Game summaries

Miami (FL)

vs. Kansas (Orange Bowl)

Post season

NFL/AFL Common Draft
Five Nittany Lions were drafted in the 1969 NFL/AFL Common Draft.

References

Penn State
Penn State Nittany Lions football seasons
Lambert-Meadowlands Trophy seasons
Orange Bowl champion seasons
College football undefeated seasons
Penn State Nittany Lions football